Nemtsovo is a rural locality (a village) in Vladimir, Vladimir Oblast, Russia. The population was 7 as of 2010. There are 15 streets.

Geography 
Nemtsovo is located 13 km west of Vladimir. Oborino is the nearest rural locality.

References 

Rural localities in Vladimir Urban Okrug